Alberto Borea Odría is a Peruvian lawyer and politician. He was Fuerza Democrática's presidential candidate for the 2006 national election.

He was Deputy from 1985 to 1990 and Senator from 1990 to 1992, when Alberto Fujimori dissolved the parliament. Later that year he participated in a failed coup attempt, led by General Jaime Salinas Sedó. From 2004 to 2005 he represented Peru at the Organization of American States. In the 2006 presidential elections he was considered to be a very minor candidate and received 0.2% of the vote, coming in 13th place. He is attempting to run again in 2016, but he is not a real contender. On December 20, 2017, at the Peruvian Congress, he defended President Pedro Pablo Kuscinsky from accusations of being morally unfit, his brilliant defence yielding a totally unexpected  positive result, as there were not enough votes cast to impeach him.

External links
Fuerza Democrática's site

Living people
Democratic Force (Peru) politicians
Candidates for President of Peru
Members of the Senate of Peru
Members of the Chamber of Deputies of Peru
Permanent Representatives of Peru to the Organization of American States
Year of birth missing (living people)